Pembine is a town in Marinette County, Wisconsin, United States. The population was 1,036 at the 2000 census. The unincorporated community of Kremlin is located in the town, The census-designated place of Pembine is also located in the town.

Geography
According to the United States Census Bureau, the town has a total area of 67.3 square miles (174.4 km2), of which, 66.3 square miles (171.8 km2) of it is land and 1.0 square miles (2.6 km2) of it (1.47%) is water. The Pemebonwon River, with Long Slide Falls, is in the immediate vicinity. Another notable waterfall, Twelve Foot Falls, is located in the town of Dunbar on the nearby Pike River.

History
The name Pembine comes from the Native American name Pemene Won Bon, also the source of the name of the Pemebonwon River. The Soo Line connected the town by rail in 1887. Pembine was part of the town of Amberg until 14 April 1914, when it was established as a separate town. The economy of Pembine was based on the logging industry, and the town declined after the Wisconsin and Michigan Railroad discontinued service in 1915. The local economy then switched to potato farming, followed by growth in the dairy industry.

Several fatal rail disasters occurred in Pembine. In 1899, two railroad workers were killed in a collision between two trains. A head-on collision between two trains in 1902 killed three men. The Soo Line was sabotaged in 1909, killing an engineer. Five people were killed when a train hit a fallen tree in 1913 and derailed. The historic train station, built in 1887, was totally destroyed by fire on June 17, 2019. Two local teenage boys were arrested in connection with the fire.

Demographics
As of the census of 2000, there were 1,036 people, 429 households, and 293 families residing in the town. The population density was 15.6 people per square mile (6.0/km2). There were 871 housing units at an average density of 13.1 per square mile (5.1/km2). The racial makeup of the town was 97.59% White, 0.19% Black or African American, 0.29% Native American, 0.58% Asian, 0.29% from other races, and 1.06% from two or more races. Hispanic or Latino of any race were 1.35% of the population.

There were 429 households, out of which 25.4% had children under the age of 18 living with them, 59.0% were married couples living together, 4.9% had a female householder with no husband present, and 31.5% were non-families. 28.2% of all households were made up of individuals, and 13.3% had someone living alone who was 65 years of age or older. The average household size was 2.41 and the average family size was 2.94.

In the town, the population was spread out, with 24.6% under the age of 18, 6.9% from 18 to 24, 24.9% from 25 to 44, 23.9% from 45 to 64, and 19.7% who were 65 years of age or older. The median age was 42 years. For every 100 females, there were 103.1 males. For every 100 females age 18 and over, there were 103.9 males.

The median income for a household in the town was $34,395, and the median income for a family was $39,479. Males had a median income of $36,810 versus $21,071 for females. The per capita income for the town was $16,459. About 7.0% of families and 8.6% of the population were below the poverty line, including 7.6% of those under age 18 and 3.1% of those age 65 or over.

Government
Pembine is governed by a town board composed of three representatives, a chairman and two representatives all elected at large. Town meetings are held the second Tuesday of each month at 6:30 p.m. at the local town hall.

Education
Pembine is served by the Pembine-Beecher-Dunbar Public School District. Pembine High School is the district's high school.

Churches

There are three churches in Pembine: Grace Lutheran Church, Northwoods Chapel, and St. Margaret's Roman Catholic Church. Two other congregations are located on Highway 141 in nearby Beecher – Crossroads Church (an Assembly of God congregation) and Faith Baptist Church.

Recreation
Pembine is a popular destination for outdoor enthusiasts, with many miles of snowmobiling and ATV trails in the area.

Notable people

 Ernest Sauld (1884–1959), businessman and politician, lived in Pembine

References

External links
Exploring Pembine
Businesses in Pembine

Towns in Marinette County, Wisconsin
Marinette micropolitan area
Towns in Wisconsin

es:Pembine (condado de Marinette, Wisconsin)